Salacighia is a genus of flowering plants belonging to the family Celastraceae.

Its native range is Western Tropical Africa to Uganda.

Species:

Salacighia letestuana 
Salacighia linderi

References

Celastraceae
Celastrales genera